The taxon Epidendrum tridentatum (species of orchids) refers to:
Epidendrum tridentatum Fawc., a synonym of Epidendrum nutans,
Epidendrum tridentatum Sw., a synonym of Lepanthes tridentata.